Joseph Browne D.D. (1700–1767) was an English clergyman and academic, Provost of The Queen's College, Oxford, from 1756.

Life
Browne was the son of George Browne, and was born at a place called the Tongue in Watermillock, Cumberland, England. He was educated at Barton school, and admitted commoner of Queen's College, Oxford, on 21 March 1717, his education being supported by a private benefactor. He was elected tabarder on the foundation of his college, and, having graduated M.A. on 4 November 1724, became a chaplain there.

Joseph Browne was elected Fellow 1 April 1731, and became a successful tutor; took the degree of D.D. 9 July 1743, and was presented by the college with the living of Bramshot, Hampshire, in 1746. In that year, he was appointed Sedleian Professor of Natural Philosophy and held that office until his death. He was instituted prebendary of Hereford Cathedral on 9 June of the same year (he was later called into residence), and on 13 February 1752 was collated to the chancellorship of the cathedral.

On 3 December 1756, Browne was elected Provost of Queen's College. From 1759 to 1765 he held the office of Vice-Chancellor of Oxford University. He had a severe stroke of palsy 25 March 1765, and died on 17 June 1767.

Works
He edited Maffei S. R. E. Card. Barberini postea Urbani VII Poemata, 1726.

References

Sources

1700 births
1767 deaths
People from Matterdale
Alumni of The Queen's College, Oxford
18th-century English Anglican priests
English chaplains
Fellows of The Queen's College, Oxford
Provosts of The Queen's College, Oxford
Sedleian Professors of Natural Philosophy
Vice-Chancellors of the University of Oxford